John Jean Goldkette (March 18, 1893 – March 24, 1962) was a jazz pianist and bandleader.

Life
Goldkette was reportedly born on March 18, 1893, in Valenciennes, France, but there is evidence that he was born in Patras, Greece. His mother, Angela Goldkette, was a circus performer from Denmark. His father is unknown.

He spent his childhood in Greece and Russia, where he studied piano at the Moscow Conservatory as a child prodigy. The family emigrated to the United States in 1911. He performed in a classical ensemble in Chicago at the age of 18, later joining one of Edgar Benson's dance orchestras.

He leased a ballroom in Detroit and formed a band which grew to success, and was the foundation for a business empire acting as an agency for twenty orchestras and owning many dance halls. In 1936, he filed for bankruptcy; however, over the next three decades, he built up business again as a musician, conductor, and promoter. He married Lee McQuillen, a newspaperwoman, on March 4, 1939.

Music career
He led many jazz and dance bands, of which the most popular was his Victor Recording Orchestra of 1924–1929. The band defeated Fletcher Henderson in a battle of the bands contest. The head arranger was Bill Challis and the musicians included Bix Beiderbecke, Steve Brown, Hoagy Carmichael, Jimmy Dorsey, Tommy Dorsey, Eddie Lang, Chauncey Morehouse, Don Murray, Bill Rank, and Spiegle Willcox. Rex Stewart, a member of Henderson's band, wrote that "It was, without any question, the greatest in the world...the original predecessor to any large white dance orchestra that followed, up to Benny Goodman." Brian Rust also called it "the greatest band of them all."

Goldkette was music director for the Detroit Athletic Club for over 20 years and co-owned the Graystone Ballroom in Detroit with Charles Horvath, who performed with the Goldkette Victor Band in its early years. He owned his own entertainment company, Jean Goldkette's Orchestras and Attractions, working out of the Book-Cadillac Hotel in Detroit. He co-wrote the song "It's the Blues (No. 14 Blues)" which was recorded in Detroit and released by Victor. He also wrote the words to the 1926 song "New Steps".

In 1927, Paul Whiteman hired most of Goldkette's better players due to Goldkette's inability to meet payroll for his top-notch musicians. Goldkette helped organize McKinney's Cotton Pickers and Glen Gray's Orange Blossoms, which became popular as the Casa Loma Orchestra. In the 1930s, he left jazz to work as a booking agent and classical pianist. In 1939, he organized the American Symphony Orchestra which debuted at Carnegie Hall. Frankie Laine worked as Goldkette's librarian.

Death
He moved to California in 1961 and the following year died in Santa Barbara, California, of a heart attack at the age of 69. He took a taxi to the hospital by himself and died that same day. He is buried in the Angelus-Rosedale Cemetery in Los Angeles, California.

References

1893 births
1962 deaths
20th-century American pianists
20th-century conductors (music)
American jazz pianists
American male pianists
Big band bandleaders
Dixieland jazz musicians
Jazz bandleaders
Musicians from Detroit
Jazz musicians from Michigan
20th-century American male musicians
American male jazz musicians
Victor Recording Orchestra members
Immigrants to the United States